Thomas Davies (born 30 June 1998) is an English professional footballer who plays as a central midfielder for  club Everton. He was a former England national under-21 team player. Davies is an academy graduate of Everton and made his first-team debut in April 2016 at the age of 17. Two years later, he became the youngest player to captain the side, doing so at the age of 20 years and 60 days.

Early and personal life
Davies was born in Liverpool, Merseyside. He is the nephew of former Everton player Alan Whittle, who made 74 appearances for the club between 1967 and 1972, and his older brother, Liam, is a semi-professional footballer who plays for Bala Town. Davies does volunteer work with the Sunday Supper Project, a local charity organization aimed at supporting Liverpool's homeless community.

Club career

Everton
Davies is an academy graduate of Everton, having joined the club at the age of 11. He became a first-year scholar ahead of the 2014–15 season and was promoted to the under-21s at the end of that campaign. Davies continued to play regularly for the under-21s the following season and signed his first professional contract on 30 September 2015. His form was rewarded when he was handed his Premier League debut by manager Roberto Martínez on 16 April 2016, coming on as an 83rd-minute substitute for Darron Gibson in a 1–1 draw with Southampton at Goodison Park. On the final day of the Premier League season, following the dismissal of Martínez, Davies was handed his first start for Everton by interim manager David Unsworth in a 3–0 win over Norwich City. His performance over the course of the 90 minutes earned him the man of the match award.

Having previously featured on occasion from the substitutes' bench, Davies made his first start of the 2016–17 Premier League campaign on 2 January 2017 and registered his first assist for Everton in a 3–0 win over Southampton. He scored his first goal for the club 13 days later when he scored in a 4–0 league victory over Manchester City. His performance also saw him named man of the match. On 9 April, he scored the joint-fastest goal of the season when he netted after just 30 seconds in a 4–2 win over reigning champions Leicester City. The following month. at the club's end of season awards dinner, Davies was named Everton's Young Player of the Year and also won the Goal of the Season and Performance of the Season honours for his role in the victory over Manchester City.

The following season, during the early stages of the campaign under manager Ronald Koeman, Everton lost six of their opening twelve matches during which Davies was predominantly used as an option from the bench and struggled to find form. He returned to form following the appointment of Sam Allardyce and in February 2018 was named by the CIES Football Observatory as the world's seventh-most promising footballer under the age of 20. Later that month he made his 50th Premier League appearance for the club in a 1–0 defeat to Watford.

On 29 August 2018, under new club manager Marco Silva, Davies captained Everton for the first time in a 3–1 EFL Cup victory over Rotherham. In doing so, and at the age of 20 years and 60 days, he became the youngest player to ever captain the club, breaking the record previously set by Steve McMahon in 1983. Later that year, he was one of 20 players nominated for the Golden Boy award, but ultimately struggled during the campaign after failing to define his role in Silva's squad, making just 16 league appearances for the season.

International career
Davies has represented England up to under-21 level. On 7 October 2015, he was invited by England manager Roy Hodgson to train with the senior squad following his progression with the under-17 side. Just seven days later, he was named captain of the England under-17 team for the 2015 FIFA U-17 World Cup in Chile. The FA agreed Everton's request to rest Davies so that he would not feature at the European Under-19 Championship for the England U-19 in summer 2017.

He represented England at the Toulon Tournament the following year and featured throughout as the nation went on to claim its third consecutive title in the competition.

Career statistics

Club

Honours
England U21
Toulon Tournament: 2018

Individual
Everton Young Player of the Season: 2016–17
Everton Goal of the Season: 2016–17
Everton Performance of the Season: 2016–17

References

External links

Profile at the Everton F.C. website

1998 births
Living people
Footballers from Liverpool
English footballers
England youth international footballers
England under-21 international footballers
Association football midfielders
Everton F.C. players
Premier League players